Alfred Weber (30 July 1868 – 2 May 1958) was a German economist, geographer, sociologist and theoretician of culture whose work was influential in the development of modern economic geography.

Life
Alfred Weber, younger brother of the well-known sociologist Max Weber, was born in Erfurt and raised in Charlottenburg. From 1907 to 1933, he was a professor at the University of Heidelberg. Weber started his carrier as a lawyer and worked as a sociologist and cultural philosopher.

Work
Weber supported reintroducing theory and causal models to the field of economics, in addition to using historical analysis. In this field, his achievements involve work on early models of industrial location. He lived during the period when sociology became a separate field of science.

Though his theory on 'Industrial Location' was strictly economic during his time it is widely studied in the field of geography now, mostly as a theoretical concept in the subdomain of economic geography.

Weber maintained a commitment to the "philosophy of history" traditions. He contributed theories for analyzing social change in Western civilization as a confluence of civilization (intellectual and technological), social processes (organizations) and culture (art, religion, and philosophy).

Least cost theory
Leaning heavily on work developed by the relatively unknown Wilhelm Launhardt, Alfred Weber formulated a least cost theory of industrial location which tries to explain and predict the locational pattern of industry at a macro scale. It emphasizes that firms seek a site with minimum costs for transport and labor.

The point for locating an industry that minimizes costs of transportation and labor requires analysis of three factors:

Material index 
The point of optimal transportation is based on the costs of distance to the "material index (MI)" – the ratio of weights of the intermediate products (raw materials or RM) to finished  product or FP.

a)  RM is more than FP;   MI>1

b)  RM is equal to FP;       MI=1

c)  RM is less than FP;      MI<1

In one scenario (a), the weight of the final product is less than the weight of the raw material going into making the product—the weight losing industry. For example, in the copper industry, it would be very expensive to haul raw materials to the market and process them there, so the processing occurs near the raw materials. (Besides mining, other primary activities (or extractive industries) are considered material oriented: timber mills, furniture manufacture, most agricultural activities, etc.. Often located in rural areas, these businesses may employ most of the local population. As they leave, the local area loses its economic base.)

In other cases, the final product is equally as heavy as the raw materials that require transport (i.e. the Material Index is equal to 1). Usually this is a case of some ubiquitous raw material, such as water, being incorporated into the product. This is called the weight-gaining industry. This type of industry might build up near a market or near a raw material source, and as a result might be called a foot-loose industry. Cotton industry is a prominent example of weight-gaining raw material.

In a third set of industries, including the heavy chemical industry, the weight of raw materials is less than the weight of the finished product. These industries always grow up near market.

Weber's point of optimal transportation is a generalization of the Fermat point problem. In its simplest form, the Fermat problem consists in locating a point D with respect to three points A, B, and C in such a way that the sum of the distances between D and each of the three other points is minimized. As for the Weber triangle problem, it consists in locating a point D with respect to three points A, B, and C in such a way that the sum of the transportation costs between D and each of the three other points is minimized. In 1971, Luc-Normand Tellier found the first direct (non iterative) numerical solution of the Fermat and Weber triangle problems. Long before Von Thünen's contributions, which go back to 1818, the Fermat point problem can be seen as the very beginning of space economy. It was formulated by the famous French mathematician Pierre de Fermat before 1640. As for the Weber triangle problem, which is a generalization of the Fermat triangle problem, it was first formulated by Thomas Simpson in 1750, and popularized by Alfred Weber in 1909.

In 1985, in a book entitled Économie spatiale: rationalité économique de l'espace habité, Tellier formulated an all-new problem called the "attraction-repulsion problem", which constitutes a generalization of both the Fermat and Weber problems. In its simplest version, the attraction-repulsion problem consists in locating a point D with respect to three points A1, A2 and R in such a way that the attractive forces exerted by points A1 and A2, and the repulsive force exerted by point R cancel each other out. In the same book, Tellier solved that problem for the first time in the triangle case, and he reinterpreted spatial economics theory, especially, the theory of land rent, in the light of the concepts of attractive and repulsive forces stemming from the attraction-repulsion problem. That problem was later further analyzed by mathematicians like Chen, Hansen, Jaumard and Tuy (1992), and Jalal and Krarup (2003). The attraction-repulsion problem is seen by Ottaviano and Thisse (2005) as a prelude to the New Economic Geography that developed in the 1990s, and earned Paul Krugman a Nobel Memorial Prize in Economic Sciences in 2008.

Agglomeration and deagglomeration
Agglomeration is the phenomenon of spatial clustering, or a concentration of firms in a relatively small area. The clustering and linkages allow individual firms to enjoy both internal and external economies. Auxiliary industries, specialized machines or services used only occasionally by larger firms, tend to be located in agglomeration areas, not just to lower costs but to serve the bigger populations.

Deglomeration occurs when companies and services leave because of the diseconomies of industries’ excessive concentration. Firms who can achieve economies by increasing their scale of industrial activities benefit from agglomeration. However, after reaching an optimal size, local facilities may become over-taxed, leading to an offset of initial advantages and increase in prime cost. Then the force of agglomeration may eventually be replaced by other forces which promote deglomeration.

Globalization
Similarly, industrial activity is considered a secondary economic activity, and is also discussed as manufacturing.  Industrial activity can be broken down further to include the following activities: processing, the creation of intermediate parts, final assembly. Today with multinational corporations, the three activities listed above may occur outside MDCs. 
 
Weber's theory can explain some of the causes for current movement, yet such discussion did not come from Weber himself. Weber found industrial activity the least expensive to produce. Least cost location then implies marketing the product at the least cost to the consumer, much like retailers attempt to obtain large market shares today. Economically, it is explained as one way to make a profit; creating the cheapest product for the consumer market leads to greater volume of sales and hence, greater profits. Therefore, companies that do not take the time to locate the cheapest inputs or the largest markets would not succeed, since their product costs more to produce and costs the consumer more.

His theory has five assumptions.  His first assumption is known as the isotropic plain assumption.  This means the model is operative in a single country with a uniform topography, climate, technology, economic system.  His second assumption is that only one finished product is considered at a time, and the product is shipped to a single market.   The third assumption is raw materials are fixed at certain locations, and the market is also a known fixed location.  The fourth assumption is labor is fixed geographically but is available in unlimited quantities at any production site selected.  The final assumption is that transport costs are a direct function of weight of the item and the distance shipped. 
 
In use with his theory he created the locational triangle.  His triangle is used with one market and two sources of material.  This illustrated that manufacturing that utilizes pure materials will never tie the processing location to the material site.  Also industries utilizing high weight loss materials will tend to be pulled toward the material source as opposed to the market. Furthermore, many industries will select an intermediate location between market and material.  The last generalization is considered to be wrong because he never takes into account terminal costs and therefore is considered biased toward intermediate locations.

To further explore the location of firms Weber also created two concepts.  The first is of an isotim, which is a line of equal transport cost for any product or material.  The second is the isodapane which is a line of total transport costs.  The isodapane is found by adding all of the isotims at a location.  The reason for using isodapanes is to systematically introduce the labor component into Weber's locational theory.

Weber has received much criticism.  It has been said that Weber did not effectively and realistically take into account geographic variation in market demand, which is considered a locational factor of paramount influence.  Also his treatment of transport did not recognize that these costs are not proportional to distance and weight, and that intermediate locations necessitate added terminal charges.  Labor is not always available in unlimited quantity at any location and is usually quite mobile through migration.  Plus most manufacturing plants obtain a large number of material inputs and produce a wide range of products for many diverse markets, so his theory doesn't easily apply.  Furthermore, he underestimated the effect of agglomeration.

Works
Über den Standort der Industrie (Theory of the Location of Industries) 1909
Ideen zur Staats - und Kultursoziologie (1927)
Kulturgeschichte als Kultursoziologie (1935)
Farewell to European History or the Conquest of Nihilism (1947)
Einführung in die Soziologie (1955)

See also
Geometric median (also known as the Fermat–Weber problem)
List of sociologists
List of economists
List of geographers
Johann Heinrich von Thünen

References

Further reading

External links
Biography at CSSS
On Alfred Weber's Theory of Industrial Location
Alfred Weber and Subsequent Developments in Industrial Location Theory
Weber' Theory of the location of industries – English translation
 
 Alfred Weber's Theory of Industrial Location

1868 births
1958 deaths
Writers from Erfurt
People from the Province of Saxony
National-Social Association politicians
German Democratic Party politicians
Social Democratic Party of Germany politicians
Candidates for President of Germany
German economists
German sociologists
Regional economists
University of Bonn alumni
University of Tübingen alumni
Academic staff of the Humboldt University of Berlin
Academic staff of Charles University
Academic staff of Heidelberg University
Recipients of the Pour le Mérite (civil class)
German magazine founders
Max Weber